Lienhard is a surname. Notable people with the surname include:

Bill Lienhard, American basketball player
Bob Lienhard, American basketball player
Erwin Lienhard (born 1957), Swiss cyclist
Fabian Lienhard (born 1993), Swiss cyclist
Fredy Lienhard, Swiss racing driver
Heinrich Lienhard, Swiss explorer
Jacob Lienhard, United States Marine Corps officer
John H. Lienhard, American engineer and historian
John H. Lienhard V, Professor of Mechanical Engineering at the Massachusetts Institute of Technology
Pepe Lienhard, Swiss musician
Siegfried Lienhard, Professor of Indology at Stockholm University
Walter Lienhard (1890–1973), Swiss sport shooter

See also
Lienhardt
Lienhart
Linhardt
Linhart

German-language surnames

de:Lienhard